The Panar (singular Pana) are a community found mainly in Kundapura Taluk, Udupi District, Karnataka, India. The Panar are classified as Scheduled caste by the government of Karnataka.

They are Kannada-speaking  and show expertise in singing paddanas (folk songs), mainly in their native Kannada, and also in Tulu languages. They claim to have originated from the Tulu-speaking Nalike/panar of Tulunadu. The name "pana" comes from the word "pan" which means "song" and Panan of Kerala, who are also called panar in Kerala are by and large identical with this caste. Panan caste is classified as Scheduled caste in Kerala State.

Chikku cult
Panar community are specialised in performing religious cult devoted to Chikku, a group of spirits, by singing folk songs combined with dance,  which are (spirits) widely believed and prayed by common people in coastal districts. The songs sung by Panar community in Kannada language are generally related to Siri Paddana songs of Tulu language. They also perform bhootha nruthya, roughly translated to "nemosthava/thaiyyam", which is similar to "spiritual dance" practiced by Panan community of Tamil Nadu and Kerala. In Tamil Nadu, the women bards and dancers belonging to "panar" community were called as 'viraliyar' as mentioned in Sangam literature.

See also
Tamil Panar

References

Social groups of Karnataka
Scheduled Tribes of India
Shudra castes
People from Udupi district